The Quiver Tree Forest (Kokerboom Woud in Afrikaans) is a forest and tourist attraction of southern Namibia. It is located about 14 km north-east of Keetmanshoop, on the road to Koës, on the Gariganus farm. It comprises about 250 specimens of Aloidendron dichotomum, a species that is also locally known as the quiver tree (Afrikaans: kokerboom) because San people traditionally used its branches to make quivers. The forest is spontaneous; the tallest quiver trees are two to three centuries old. The forest was declared a national monument of Namibia in 1995.

The quiver tree is also known for looking upside down because the "leaves" look somewhat similar to roots. This tree has a long history of beliefs that it will bring good luck to anybody that worships a tree and nurtures it. Since diamonds are very rich in Namibia, people say that if one of these trees is dug up, one will get diamonds in their lifetime, but since these trees are blessed nobody wants to dig them up.

Near the forest, there is another site of natural interest (itself a tourist attraction) for its geology, the Giant's Playground, a vast pile of large dolerite rocks.

Ecology
The Quiver Tree Forest holds tremendous ecological value within its native landscape. Bright yellow flowers bloom from June to July, when a huge variety of insects, birds, and mammals are drawn to the abundant nectar.

Fauna
The forest is home to rock hyraxes living amongst the rocks.

Other Quiver Tree Forests
Although Aloe dichotoma is common in southern Africa, there are only a small number of quiver tree forests proper. Most have been created by men; one of them is found in the Karoo National Botanical Garden of Worcester, South Africa.

References

External links
 The web site of the Quiver Tree Forest Rest Camp

Geography of ǁKaras Region
National Monuments of Namibia